The Brazilian ironclad Tamandaré was an armored gunboat built for the Imperial Brazilian Navy during the Paraguayan War in the mid-1860s. She bombarded the Paraguayan fortifications blocking access up the Paraná and Paraguay Rivers as well as bombarding Paraguayan positions in support of the Imperial Brazilian Army. The ship participated in the Passage of Humaitá in February 1868 and was badly damaged. After Tamandaré was repaired she provided fire support for the army for the rest of the war, aside from bombarding Paraguyan capital of Asunción once. The ship was assigned to the Mato Grosso Flotilla after the war. Tamandaré was decommissioned in 1879 and scrapped afterwards.

Design and description
Tamandaré was designed to meet the need of the Brazilian Navy for a small, simple, shallow-draft armored ship capable of withstanding heavy fire. The ship is best characterized as a central battery design because the casemate did not extend the length of the ship. The hull was sheathed with Muntz metal to reduce biofouling. On riverine operations, the bulwarks, and the ship's masts, were usually removed.

Her crew numbered 120 officers and men.

Propulsion
Tamandaré had a single John Penn & Sons 2-cylinder steam engine taken from the British-built wooden gunboat Tietê and proved unreliable in service. The ship's funnel was mounted directly in front of her casemate. Tamandaré carried enough coal for six days' steaming.

Armament
Tamandaré mounted one 70-pounder Whitworth rifled muzzle loader, three 68-pounder and two 12-pounder smoothbore guns in her casemate. To minimize the possibility of shells or splinters entering the casemate through the gunports they were as small as possible, allowing only a 24°-arc of fire for each gun. The rectangular,  casemate had two gun ports on each side as well as the front and rear.

The exact type of 12-pounder gun is not known. All of the guns could fire both solid shot and explosive shells.

Armor
It had a maximum thickness of  covering the machinery and magazines,  elsewhere.

Service

Tamandaré was laid down at the Arsenal de Marinha da Côrte in Rio de Janeiro on 31 May 1865, during the Paraguayan War, which saw Argentina and Brazil allied against Paraguay. She was launched on 21 June 1865, completed on 16 September and cost £40,506. The ship arrived at Corrientes on 16 March 1866; the next day she sailed for the confluence of the Paraná and Paraguay Rivers to begin operations against the Paraguayans. On 26 March she bombarded the defenses of Itapirú and sank one Paraguayan boat (chata). During her bombardment on the following day, a shell entered one of her gun ports, despite the chain curtain that protected it, and killed 14 men, including her captain, lieutenant Antônio Carlos de Mariz e Barros, and wounded 20. Between 24 and 29 December Barroso, Tamandaré, Brasil, and 11 gunboats bombarded Curuzu Fort again.

On 8 January 1867 Tamandaré, Bahia and  bombarded Paraguayan fortifications at Curupaity. The Brazilians broke through the river defenses at Curupaity during daylight on 15 August 1867 with Barroso, Tamanadaré, and eight other ironclads. The ships were hit 256 times, but not seriously damaged, and only suffered 10 killed and 22 wounded. Tamandarés engines broke down while she was in front of the guns and she had to be towed to safety by the ironclad . They were quickly repaired and Tamandaré bombarded Paraguayan artillery batteries at Timbó that commanded the Paraguay River north of Humaitá the next day. The Paraguayans repeated the operation again on 9 September with much the same result. On 26 September the Paraguyans moved a large-caliber gun below Humaitá and bombarded the Brazilian squadron, but it was silenced by gunfire from Tamandaré and Bahia.

On 19 February 1868 six Brazilian ironclads, including Tamandaré, steamed past Humaitá at night. Both Tamandaré, which had taken an estimated 120 hits, and Pará had to be beached after passing the fortress to prevent them from sinking. Tamandaré was under repair at São José do Cerrito until mid-March. On 25 November the ship bombarded the Paraguyan capital of Asunción. Tamandaré and Alagoas destroyed the artillery batteries at Timbó on 23 March 1869. The ship was assigned to the Mato Grosso Flotilla, based in Ladário, after the war. Tamandaré was decommissioned on 18 April 1879 and scrapped afterwards.

Footnotes

References

External links
 Brief history of Tamandaré 

Ships built in Brazil
Gunboats of the Brazilian Navy
Ironclad warships of the Brazilian Navy
1865 ships
Riverine warfare
Maritime incidents in February 1868